The Avantiswami Temple is an ancient ruined Hindu temple located on the banks of the Jhelum River, 28 km away from Srinagar in Awantipora, Jammu and Kashmir, India. It's ruins once consisted of two temples dedicated to Shiva and Vishnu, and were built under king Avantivarman of the Utpala dynasty in the 9th century CE. The site is maintained by the Archaeological Survey of India. Locals call the temple Pandav Lari, meaning "house of the Pandavas".

History

The temple was built by king Awantivarman in the year 853–855 CE. Originally known as Viswasara, the ancient town was also a capital city. Avantivarman was also the founder of Avantipur and of the Utpala dynasty in the 9th century CE. He had built many Hindu temples in Kashmir during his reign, which were largely destroyed due to Muslim conquests. During the reign of Avantivarman, the region prospered. The Avantiswami Temple is an example of the stone temple architecture of Kashmir during that era.

Prior to the Muslim conquests, Kashmir was a centre of Shaivism and Hindu philosophy, and a seat of Sanskrit learning and literature. By the 14th century, Kashmir had come under Muslim rule, and most of its early temples were deserted or sacked by the early 15th century. Two temples here are attributed to him: the Avantiswami Temple dedicated to Vishnu and the Avantishwara Temple dedicated to Shiva. The Avantiswami is smaller in size, but similar to the earlier Martand Sun Temple in planning.

References

Hindu temples in Jammu and Kashmir
9th-century Hindu temples
Utpala dynasty